Harragas is a 2009 film.

Synopsis 
Harragas are clandestine immigrants that flee their country to escape from poverty. The story takes place in Mostaganem, on the Algerian coast. The boatman, Hassan, prepares the secret crossing to Spain of a group of ten illegal immigrants that barely take anything with them: a change of clothes, a cell phone, and a bit of money. Harragas tells the odyssey of this group of people who dream of Spain, barely 125 miles from the Algerian coast and the door that opens onto the European "El Dorado".

Awards 
 Festival de Cine Mediterráneo de Valencia 2009
 Festival Internacional de Cine de Dubái 2009

External links 

 

2009 films
Algerian drama films
French drama films
2000s French films